Cleo Communications LLC, simply refereed to as Cleo, is a privately held software company founded in 1976.

History 
Cleo originally began as a division of Phone 1 Inc., a voice data gathering systems manufacturer, and built data concentrators and terminal emulators — multi-bus computers, modems, and terminals to interface with IBM mainframes via bisynchronous communications. The company then began developing mainframe middleware in the 1980s, and with the rise of the PC, moved into B2B data communications and secure file transfer software. Since being acquired in 2012 the company’s offerings have evolved into Cleo Integration Cloud, a platform for enterprise business integration.

Business 
Based in Rockford, Illinois (USA), with offices in Chicago, London, and Bangalore, Cleo has about 300 employees and more than 4,000 direct customers. The company's flagship offering, Cleo Integration Cloud, provides both on-premise and cloud-based integration technologies and comprises solutions for B2B/EDI, application integration and data movement and transformation. Previous products now incorporated into the Cleo Integration Cloud platform include Cleo Harmony, Cleo Clarify, and Cleo Jetsonic.

Cleo solutions span a variety of industries, including manufacturing, logistics and supply chain, retail, third-party logistics, warehouse management and transportation management, healthcare, financial services and government. The U.S. Department of Veterans Affairs adopted Cleo's fax technology, Cleo Streem, in 2013 when in need of FIPS 140-2-compliant technology to protect information, and the City of Atlanta has used Cleo Streem for network and desktop faxing since 2006. Cleo also serves U.S. transportation logistics company MercuryGate International and SaaS-based food logistics organization ArrowStream, powers the architecture for several major supply chain companies, such as Blue Yonder and SAP, and integrates the pharmaceutical supply chain for such companies as Octapharma. Notable manufacturing customers include Duraflame, Inc., Sauder Woodworking, and Camira Fabrics Ltd.  Key partners include FourKites and ClientsFirst, among many others.

Expansion 
In June 2014, Cleo opened an office in Chicago for members of its support and engineering teams. The company in 2014 hired Jorge Rodriguez as senior vice president of product development and John Thielens as vice president of technology. Cleo hired Dave Brunswick as vice president of solutions for North America in 2015, and Cleo hired Ken Lyons to lead global sales in 2016.  More recent additions to the company's leadership team include Drew Skarupa, CFO, Vipin Mittal, vice president, Vidya Chadaga, vice president, Products, and Tushar Patel, CMO. 

Cleo opened its product development facility in Bengaluru, India, in 2015 and expanded its hybrid cloud integration teams into a new office there in 2017. The company also opened a London office in 2016 and expanded its network of channel partners in EMEA.

In 2016, Cleo acquired EXTOL International, a Pottsville, Pa.-based business and EDI integration and data transformation company for an undisclosed amount. In 2017, the company moved its headquarters from Loves Park, Illinois, to Rockford.  In 2021 the company received a significant growth investment from H.I.G. Capital.

Certification 
Cleo regularly submits its products to Drummond Group's interoperability software testing for AS2, AS3 and ebMS 2.0.

In January 2020, Cleo announced that its new application connector for Acumatica ERP has been recognized as an Acumatica-Certified Application (ACA).  The company also holds SOC 2, Type 2 certification.

Awards 
Cleo was a Xerox partner of the year award for five years, from 2009 to 2014. The Cleo Streem solution integrates with Xerox multi-function products, providing customers with solutions for network fax and interactive messaging needs.

Cleo was named to Food Logistics’ FL100+ Top Software and Technology Providers Lists in 2016, 2017, 2019 and 2020

References 

EDI software companies
Software companies based in Illinois
Network management
Managed file transfer
File transfer protocols
Data management
Software companies of the United States